Gerlach I of Isenburg-Arnfels was the Count of Isenburg-Arnfels from 1286 (1287) until 1303.

Gerlach was the youngest son of Count Henry II of Isenburg-Grenzau. In 1286 he partitioned his lands between his sons, and Gerlach as the youngest received those around Bad Hönningen. He was succeeded by his son Theodoric in 1303.

1303 deaths
House of Isenburg
Year of birth unknown